Meharia tancredii is a moth in the family Cossidae. It is found in northern Iran.

References

Moths described in 1963
Meharia